Janice Patrice Gaines (née: Reddick; born May 22, 1981), is a Stellar Award and GMA Dove Award-nominated American urban contemporary gospel singer and songwriter. Her debut singles, "Wait On You" and "The Break-Up Song," were released as an extended play album on April 14, 2015. Her debut album, "Greatest Life Ever," released on Motown Gospel, was produced by GRAMMY Award-winning producer LaShawn Daniels. and debuted in the Top 10 on the Billboard Top Gospel Albums chart.

Early and personal life
Gaines was born, Janice Patrice Reddick, in St. Louis, Missouri, on May 22, 1981, but raised in Memphis, Tennessee. She grew up singing in church, where her father was a Methodist minister, Lawrence Lewis Reddick III, and her mother, a singer-songwriter/musician, Jacquelyn Reddick-Jones (née, Merriwether), and she has a brother, Jon. As a teenager, Gaines was the youngest member of the Memphis-based community choir O'Landa Draper & The Associates. Gaines attended Oberlin College in Oberlin, OH, during which time she sang background vocals for R&B singer Howard Hewett. Following college, Gaines attended Ashland Theological Seminary, where she received a Masters of Divinity, before moving to New York City to teach seventh-grade math in the Bronx. She presently resides in Franklin, Tennessee, with her husband, Erik Justin "E.J." Gaines.

Music career
In 2010, Janice Gaines began touring the nation as a member of the Worship Team for Women of Faith, a Christian-based live events organization. Following the 2012 release of her debut single, "One Day," Gaines caught the attention of Motown Gospel president Ken Pennell, who later signed her to a recording agreement.

In December 2014, Janice Gaines was featured on the Motown Christmas album, singing a duet with GRAMMY Award-nominated R&B/soul singer Kem (singer) on the song "Bethlehem."

In 2015, Motown Gospel released two singles from Janice Gaines-- "Wait On You" and "The Break-Up Song". "Wait On You" peaked at No. 21 on Billboard's Hot Gospel Songs chart. Her debut album, Greatest Life Ever, produced by GRAMMY Award-winning producer LaShawn Daniels, was released on October 9, 2015, and debuted at No. 7 on Billboard's Top Gospel Albums chart.

In 2016, Janice Gaines earned her first GMA Dove Award nomination for her debut single, "Wait On You," in the Contemporary Gospel/Urban Recorded Song of the Year category. In 2017, Gaines earned her first Stellar Award nomination for Contemporary Female Vocalist of the Year.

Discography

Singles

Awards

GMA Dove Awards

Stellar Awards

References

1981 births
African-American Christians
Musicians from Memphis, Tennessee
21st-century American singers
Living people
American gospel singers
Musicians from St. Louis
Oberlin College alumni
Singers from Missouri
21st-century African-American musicians